Nodaway is an unincorporated community in Andrew County, in the U.S. state of Missouri.

History
Nodaway was founded in 1868, and named after the nearby Nodaway River. A post office called Nodaway was established in 1868, and remained in operation until  1957.

References

Unincorporated communities in Andrew County, Missouri
Lewis and Clark Expedition
Unincorporated communities in Missouri